Dobell is a surname. Notable people with the surname include

Bertram Dobell (1842–1914), English bookseller, literary scholar, editor and author
Charles Macpherson Dobell (1869–1954), Canadian soldier
Clifford Dobell (1886–1949), British biologist
Doug Dobell (1917–1987), British record store proprietor and record producer
Elizabeth Mary Dobell (1828-1908), English poet
Eva Dobell (1867–1963), British poet, nurse, and editor
Horace Dobell (c. 1827 – 1917), English doctor and medical writer
Richard Reid Dobell (1836–1902), Canadian businessman and politician
Sydney Thompson Dobell (1824–1874), English poet and critic
William Dobell (1899–1970), Australian artist

See also 
Dobell Prize, prize for drawing in Australia
Division of Dobell, an Australian electoral Division in New South Wales